The Roman Catholic Diocese of St. George's in Grenada is a diocese, of the Latin Church of the Roman Catholic Church in the Caribbean, which encompasses only and the entirety of Grenada. It is a suffragan of the Metropolitan Archdiocese of Castries (Saint Lucia) and a member of the Antilles Episcopal Conference, het depends on the missionary Roman Congregation for the Evangelization of Peoples.

Its cathedral episcopal see is Immaculate Conception Cathedral, in national capital St. George's, Grenada.

History 
 It was erected on 20 February 1956 as Diocese of St. George's in Grenada, on British Antillian territory split off from the Metropolitan Archdiocese of Port of Spain
 It lost territory on 1970.03.07 to establish the Diocese of Bridgetown-Kingstown.

Statistics 
As per 2014, it pastorally served 46,485 Catholics (45.4% of 102,295 total)  on 340 km² in 20 parishes and 1 mission with 23 priests (7 diocesan, 16 religious), 8 deacons and 53 lay religious (20 brothers, 33 sisters) .

Bishops 
(all Roman Rite)

Episcopal Ordinaries 
Suffragan Bishops of Saint George's in Grenada 
 Justin James Field, Dominican Order (O.P.) (born England, UK) (1957.01.14 – death 1969.08.04)
 Patrick Webster, Benedictine Order (O.S.B.) (born Saint Lucia) (1970.03.07 – 1974.11.18), succeeding as former Titular Bishop of Otočac (1969.06.26 – 1970.03.07), Auxiliary Bishop of Saint George's in Grenada (1969.06.26 – 1970.03.07) and Apostolic Administrator of Saint George's in Grenada (1969.08.05 – 1970.03.07); later Metropolitan Archbishop of Castries (Saint Lucia) (1974.11.18 – retired 1979.05.10), died 1989
 Sydney Anicetus Charles (born Trinidad and Tobago) (1974.11.18 – retired 2002.07.10 - died 2018.09.04
 Vincent (Matthew) Darius, O.P. (born Grenada) (2002.07.10 – death 2016.04.26)
 Clyde Martin Harvey (born Trinidad and Tobago) (2017.06.23 – ...), no previous prelature.

Auxiliary bishop
Patrick Webster, O.S.B. (1969-1970), appointed Bishop here

See also 
 List of Catholic dioceses in Grenada

Sources and external links 
 GCatholic with Google map - data for all section
 

Roman Catholic dioceses in the Caribbean
Religious organizations established in 1956
Roman Catholic dioceses and prelatures established in the 20th century
Roman Catholic Ecclesiastical Province of Castries